Alexander Ivanov (łacinka: Alaksandar Ivanoŭ, born 29 October 1994), also known as Ivan, is a Belarusian-Russian singer. He represented Belarus in the Eurovision Song Contest 2016 with the song "Help You Fly". Ivanov was also to represent Russia in the Intervision Song Contest 2015 but the contest never happened.

Eurovision 2016
It was reported in the Belarusian media that Ivanov intended to perform his entry naked with two wolves on stage. His producer tried to get permission to get wolves on stage, considering the "no live animals" policy of the competition. Organizers didn't allow either request, but the presentation included animated scenes of wolves appearing on screen. Ivanov performed his song "Help You Fly" on 12 May 2016 in Eurovision's second semi-final, but failed to qualify to the 14 May 2016 final.

Personal life
His great-grandmother was Moldovan.

Discography

Singles

References

External links

  

1994 births
21st-century Belarusian male singers
Living people
People from Gomel
Eurovision Song Contest entrants for Belarus
Eurovision Song Contest entrants of 2016
Belarusian people of Moldovan descent
21st-century Russian male singers
21st-century Russian singers
Belarusian expatriates in Russia